Isostenosmylus is a genus of neotropical osmylid in the subfamily Stenosmylinae. It has been called "the most species-rich genus of lance lacewings in the Neotropical region."

Species 
Species accepted within Isostenosmylus include:

 Isostenosmylus angustipennis Martins et al., 2019
 Isostenosmylus angustipennis Martins et al., 2019
 Isostenosmylus barbatus Martins et al., 2019
 Isostenosmylus bifurcatus Ardila-Camacho et al., 2016
 Isostenosmylus contrerasi Ardila-Camacho and Noriega, 2014
 Isostenosmylus fasciatus Kimmins, 1940
 Isostenosmylus fusciceps Kimmins, 1940
 Isostenosmylus inca Martins et al., 2019
 Isostenosmylus irroratus Ardila-Camacho et al., 2016
 Isostenosmylus jaguar Martins et al., 2019
 Isostenosmylus julianae Ardila-Camacho et al., 2016
 Isostenosmylus morenoi (Navás, 1928)
 Isostenosmylus nigrifrons Kimmins, 1940
 Isostenosmylus penai Martins et al., 2019
 Isostenosmylus pulverulentus (Gerstaecker, 1893)
 Isostenosmylus septemtrionalandinus Ardila-Camacho and Noriega, 2014
 Isostenosmylus triangulatus Martins et al., 2019

References

Neuroptera
Neuroptera genera